Streptomyces drozdowiczii is a cellulolytic bacterium species from the genus of Streptomyces which has been isolated from soil from the Mata Atlântica forest in Brazil.

See also 
 List of Streptomyces species

References

Further reading

External links
Type strain of Streptomyces drozdowiczii at BacDive -  the Bacterial Diversity Metadatabase

drozdowiczii
Bacteria described in 2004